Manthe Ribane is an artist, performer, and musician based in South Africa and the Creative Director at 113 Studios. OkayAfrica described her as a "master of Afrofuturism" in her style and aesthetic.

Dazed wrote that, of the many performance mediums for which Ribane is known, her dance was her "most imaginative and magnetic". Well-known in South Africa's dance scene, she has mastered styles including pantsula, crumping, and voguing. She danced for Die Antwoord on tour. In 2019, she choreographed La Maison Noir: The Gift And The Curse, a visual novel by Petite Noir.

As a musician, Ribane has collaborated with rapper Spoek Mathambo. With Hyperdub producer Okzharp, she released a gqom EP in 2016 and a debut R&B-influenced album, Closer Apart, in 2018.

References

Further reading

External links 
 

1980s births
South African artists
South African musicians
South African female dancers
Living people
Place of birth missing (living people)